Branišov is a municipality and village in České Budějovice District in the South Bohemian Region of the Czech Republic. It has about 300 inhabitants.

History
The first written mention of Branišov is from 1391.

References

Villages in České Budějovice District